Game Show in My Head was an American television game show produced by Ashton Kutcher and hosted by Joe Rogan. The show premiered on CBS on January 3, 2009, and aired on Saturdays at 8PM Eastern Standard Time.

History
CBS originally ordered a pilot of Game Show in My Head hosted by Chris Kattan, but later decided to re-shoot the pilot with a new host, Joe Rogan. CBS ordered an unnamed number of episodes of the series. In March 2008, the show began seeking contestants. In December 2008, CBS announced that they would begin airing episodes of the new version of the show on Saturdays, starting January 3, 2009.

Saturdays are the least-watched night of the week, this move has inspired speculation that the network has a lack of faith in the program.

Gameplay
Game Show in My Head is a hidden camera show in which contestants must perform a series of five "hilarious and embarrassing" tasks in front of strangers, which they are instructed to do by the host via an earpiece.

Each of the tasks is worth $5,000, and contestants can also double their money in a "no-holds-barred bonus round."  Therefore, the maximum amount of money that a contestant can earn is $50,000. The show is similar to the classic Nickelodeon game show You're On!. That is, the contestants have to get strangers to complete tasks while they're caught on a hidden camera. The contestants on location and in studio are taped live.

Game Show in My Head premiered with Two Back-to Back Episodes on Saturday, January 3, 2009 (8:00-9:00 PM, ET/PT). Shalisse Pekarcik, a 26-year-old personal trainer from Salt Lake City, Utah, and Craig Scime, a 32-year-old entrepreneur from Buffalo, New York, competed for the chance to win $50,000 each.

Ratings

References

External links

American hidden camera television series
CBS original programming
Television series by 20th Century Fox Television
2009 American television series debuts
2009 American television series endings
2000s American reality television series
2000s American game shows